We Do may refer to:
We Do (documentary), 2015 film about  marriage equality
"We Do", a song from Homer the Great
We Do, the title of an album and single released by Ikimono-gakari in December, 2019.